The Democratic Party leadership election was held on 14 December 2008 for the 30-member 8th Central Committee of the Democratic Party in Hong Kong, including chairman and two vice-chairman posts. Incumbent Chairman Albert Ho re-elected uncontestedly, while Sin Chung-kai and Emily Lau defeated Andrew Cheng as the two Vice-Chairmen.

Eligibility
The Central Committee was elected by the party congress. All public office holders, including the members of the Legislative Council and District Councils, are eligible to vote in the party congress. Every 30 members can also elect a delegate who holds one vote in the congress.

Overview
The Democratic Party formally merged with the Frontier in November 2008. The Convenor of the Frontier, Emily Lau Wai-hing contested for the Vice-Chair post with incumbent Vice-Chairman Sin Chung-kai as Albert Ho's cabinet, while Albert Ho sought for re-election for his second term. Another incumbent Vice-Chairman said he would give up his post to Emily Lau, in order to show spirit of solidarity and cooperation between the merged parties.

Reformist legislator Andrew Cheng Kar-foo decided to run for the Vice-Chairman post on 26 November, stating that he would like to lead the party with Albert Ho and Emily Lau.

Results
Albert Ho was re-elected Chairman with 93% confident votes. Emily Lau and Sin Chung-kai were elected with 228 and 205 votes respectively, while Andrew Cheng got 132 votes. Cheng expected his loss to the Mainstreamers, admitting his political ideas not being accepted by the majority was the cause of the failure. 10 of the 27 Central Committee members were newcomers, 4 of them were former members of the Frontier. Only Yam Kai-bong in the Reformist faction was elected, Michael Yung Ming-chau and Kwan Wing-yip were both defeated.

Being the first Chairwoman of the party, Emily Lau said she hope to help strengthening the democratic movement, to see universal suffrage being implemented as soon as possible, and to take back party members' Home Return Permits. She also said her demand for dialogue with the central government remained unchanged.

The elected members of the 8th Central Committee are listed as following:
Chairman: Albert Ho
Vice-Chairpersons: Emily Lau, Sin Chung-kai
Secretary: Cheung Yin-tung
Treasurer: Tsui Hon-kwong
Executive Committee Members:

 Josephine Chan Shu-ying
 Andrew Cheng Kar-foo
 Fung Wai-kwong
 Law Chi-kwong
 Lee Wing-tat
 Mok Siu-lun
 Ricky Or Yiu-lam
 Tik Chi-yuen
 Wong Sing-chi
 Yeung Sum

Central Committee Members:

 Cheung Yuet-lan
 Chiu Chung-lam
 Joseph Chow Kam-siu
 Chui Pak-tai
 Lam Chung-hoi
 Howard Lam Tsz-kin
 Joanna Leung Suk-ching
 Mark Li Kin-yin
 Fred Li Wah-ming
 Li Wing-shing
 Stanley Ng Wing-fai
 James To Kun-sun
 Christopher Tsoi Yu-long
 Wu Chi-wai
 Yam Kai-bong

References

Political party leadership elections in Hong Kong
Democratic Party (Hong Kong)
2008 in Hong Kong
2008 elections in China
Democratic Party (HK) leadership election